Francis Wilson (born 1904) was a Scottish footballer who played as an outside right.

He began his senior career at hometown club Motherwell, being farmed out to non-league Mid-Annandale, helping them win the Scottish Qualifying Cup. In 1928 he moved to neighbours Hamilton Academical in a swap deal involving defender Sandy Hunter and became established at Accies, forming a wing partnership with Willie Moffat; the team reached the semi-finals of the Scottish Cup three times during his five-year spell at Douglas Park.

In 1933 Wilson signed for Preston North End but was sold on after one season to Falkirk. He then switched to Northern Ireland with Glentoran, returned to Scotland with Alloa Athletic then had another short spell in northern England, this time with Rochdale, before joining Ross County of the Highland League. During World War II he featured for Hamilton and Aberdeen.

References 

1904 births
Date of birth missing
Year of death missing
Scottish footballers
Association football outside forwards
English Football League players
Footballers from Motherwell
Scottish Football League players
Scottish Junior Football Association players
NIFL Premiership players
Highland Football League players
Hamilton Academical F.C. players
Motherwell F.C. players
Mid-Annandale F.C. players
Ross County F.C. players
Preston North End F.C. players
Alloa Athletic F.C. players
Glentoran F.C. players
Falkirk F.C. players
Rochdale A.F.C. players
Aberdeen F.C. wartime guest players
Hamilton Academical F.C. wartime guest players